Gile is a surname. Notable people with the surname include:

Dennis Gile (born 1981), American football player
Don Gile (born 1935), American baseball player
Frank S. Gile (1847–1898), American sailor
Kenneth L. Gile (born 1947), American businessman
Krista Gile, American statistician
Mary Stuart Gile (1936-2019), American politician
Ransom Henry Gile (1836–1916), American settler
Selden Connor Gile (1877–1947), American painter